Time & Love is an album by American vocalists Jackie Cain and Roy Kral featuring performances recorded in 1972 and released on the CTI label.

Reception
The AllMusic review states "Although neither Jackie nor Roy do anything resembling jazz singing here, forget about categories; this is gorgeous music that cannot be shackled to a label".

Track listing
 "Day by Day" (Stephen Schwartz, John-Michael Tebelak) - 4:48 
 "Time & Love" (Don Sebesky, Danny Meehan) - 2:32 
 "Summer Song/Summertime" (Dave Brubeck/George Gershwin, DuBose Heyward) - 4:41 
 "Bachianas Brasileiras #5" (Heitor Villa-Lobos, Ruth V. Correa, Harvey Officer) - 4:27 
 "A Simple Song" (Leonard Bernstein, Schwartz) - 5:50 
 "Heading" (Jackie Cain, Roy Kral) - 2:53 
 "Lazy Afternoon" (John Treville Latouche, Jerome Moross) - 4:40 
 "We Could Be Flying" (Paul Williams, Michel Colombier) - 4:44 
 "Tapestry" (Carole King) - 3:10 
 "Tomorrow's Dream" (Kral) 3:38 
Recorded at Van Gelder Studio in Englewood Cliffs, New Jersey on June 6–8 and 20, 1972

Personnel
Jackie Cain, Roy Kral - vocals
Paul Desmond - alto saxophone (track 3)
John Frosk, Alan Rubin - trumpet, flugelhorn  
Marvin Stamm - trumpet, piccolo trumpet, flugelhorn
Wayne Andre, Garnett Brown - trombone
Paul Faulise - bass trombone
James Buffington, Peter Gordon - French horn
Hubert Laws - flute, alto flute, bass flute, piccolo
Romeo Penque - clarinet, bass clarinet flute, alto flute, oboe
George Marge - clarinet, bass clarinet, alto flute, English horn
Phil Bodner - clarinet, flute, alto flute, oboe
Bob James - electric piano
Pat Rebillott, Jay Berliner - guitar 
Ron Carter - bass
Billy Cobham - drums
Phil Kraus, Airto Moreira - percussion
Harry Cykman, Bernard Eichen, Max Ellen, Paul Gershman, Felix Giglio, Emanuel Green, Harold Kohon, Charles Libove, Harry Lookofsky, David Nadien, Raoul Poliakin, Max Pollikoff, Elliot Rosoff, Irving Spice - violin
Alfred Brown, Emanuel Vardi - viola 
Seymour Barab, Alla Goldberg, Charles McCracken, George Ricci, Lucien Schmit, Alan Shulman, Anthony Sophos - cello
Don Sebesky - arranger, conductor

References

CTI Records albums
Jackie and Roy albums
1972 albums
Albums produced by Creed Taylor
Albums arranged by Don Sebesky
Albums recorded at Van Gelder Studio